The 2022 CONCACAF W Championship Group B was one of the two groups in the group stage of the 2022 CONCACAF W Championship, held from 4–11 July 2022 in Mexico. The teams in this group were Canada, Costa Rica, Panama, and Trinidad and Tobago. The top two teams qualified for the knockout stage and the 2023 FIFA Women's World Cup, while the third-placed team qualified for the 2023 FIFA Women's World Cup repêchage.

Teams

Standings

Matches
All times are local, CDT (UTC−5).

Costa Rica vs Panama

Canada vs Trinidad and Tobago

Trinidad and Tobago vs Costa Rica

Panama vs Canada

Canada vs Costa Rica

Panama vs Trinidad and Tobago

|}

{| style="width:100%; font-size:90%;"
|
Player of the Match:
 Marta Cox

Discipline

Fair play points were used as tiebreakers in the group if the overall and head-to-head records of teams were tied. These are calculated based on yellow and red cards received in all group matches as follows:

 first yellow card: minus 1 point;
 indirect red card (second yellow card): minus 3 points;
 direct red card: minus 4 points;
 yellow card and direct red card: minus 5 points;

References